Eugene "Gene" Wilson (11 September 1932 – March 2006) was an English professional footballer who played as a winger.

Career
Born in Sheffield, Wilson played for Sheffield Wednesday, Rotherham United, Stockport County and Altrincham. He also played for Wigan Athletic in the 1963–64 season.

References

External links
 

1932 births
2006 deaths
English footballers
Association football wingers
Sheffield Wednesday F.C. players
Rotherham United F.C. players
Stockport County F.C. players
Altrincham F.C. players
Wigan Athletic F.C. players
English Football League players